The Apostolic Nunciature to Ukraine the diplomatic mission of the Holy See to Ukraine. It is located in Kyiv. The current Apostolic Nuncio is Archbishop Visvaldas Kulbokas, who was named to the position by Pope Francis on 15 June 2021.

The Apostolic Nunciature in Ukraine is an ecclesiastical office of the Catholic Church in Ukraine, with the rank of an embassy. The nuncio serves both as the ambassador of the Holy See to the President of Ukraine, and as delegate and point-of-contact between the Catholic hierarchy in Ukraine and the Pope.

History 
Contacts between the Holy See and the rulers of Ukraine were intermittent and of little consequence before the modern era. The Western Ukrainian People's Republic, created in November 1918, had diplomatic relations with the Holy See before it was annexed to Poland after eight months. Pope Benedict XV received its ambassador, Count Mykhailo Tyshkevych, in May 1919 and the pope in turn named Fr. Giovanni Genocci his apostolic visitator in Ukraine on 23 February 1920. Genocci returned to Rome in December 1921 once the Bolshevik offensive made his continued presence in Ukraine untenable.

The Holy See and Ukraine established diplomatic relations on 8 February 1992, and Pope John Paul II issued the brief «Ucrainam Nationem» that founded the Apostolic Nunciature to Ukraine that same day.

Apostolic Nuncios 
Antonio Franco (28 March 1992 – 6 April 1999)
Nikola Eterović (22 May 1999 – 11 February 2004)
Ivan Jurkovič (22 April 2004 – 19 February 2011)
Thomas Gullickson (21 May 2011 – 5 September 2015)
Claudio Gugerotti (13 November 2015 – 4 July 2020)
Visvaldas Kulbokas (15 June 2021 – present)

See also 
 Roman Catholic Archdiocese of Lviv
 Holy See–Ukraine relations
 List of diplomatic missions of the Holy See
 Foreign relations of Ukraine
 Diplomatic missions in Ukraine
 Diplomatic missions of the Holy See

References

External links 
 
 Catholic Hierarchy: Nunciature to Ukraine 

Holy See–Ukraine relations
Holy See
Ukraine

Shevchenkivskyi District, Kyiv